Killer Sounds is the third studio album by English indie rock band Hard-Fi. It was released on 19 August 2011 in the United Kingdom and Ireland.

The iTunes bonus track "Like a Drug" was featured on the deluxe edition of the soundtrack of The Twilight Saga: Breaking Dawn – Part 1.

Singles
 "Good for Nothing" was released as the first single from the album on 17 June 2011 and debuted at number 51 on the UK Singles Chart.
 "Fire in the House" was released as the second single on 5 August 2011 and debuted at number 170 on the UK Singles Chart.
 "Bring It On" was released as the third single on 24 October 2011 subsequently failing to chart in the UK Singles Chart that week.

Critical reception

Upon its release, the album received mostly positive reviews from critics. The Metro gave it four out of five stars, saying: "Hard-Fi’s Killer Sounds features a collection of punchy potential hits on which a real sense of fun (and, dare we say it, camp) abounds."

A negative review came from James Lachno in The Daily Telegraph who awarded the album one star out of five. He called it "moody" and "humourless" and said that the "sexualised lyrics sound seedy - or worse, menacing".

Track listing
All songs written by Richard Archer.

Release history

References

2011 albums
Albums produced by Alan Moulder
Albums produced by Greg Kurstin
Albums produced by Stuart Price
Hard-Fi albums